Line A is a line of the Prague Metro, serving the Czech capital. Chronologically the second line in the system, it was first opened in 1978 and has expanded mostly during the 1980s. An extension with a further five stations to the airport is currently planned.

History
Construction of the first segment started in 1973, part of this segment was also a tunnel connecting this line with the already existing Line C between Muzeum and Náměstí Míru stations. After completion of the second section, work was started on the extension to the new metro depot at Hostivař. In 1990 Skalka station was opened, again on that line, and in 2006 Depo Hostivař station was opened, built in a former wash-stand of the depot.

Rolling stock
81-71: 1978 - late 2006
81-71M: early 2006 - present

Future

The first phase of a CZK18.7 billion extension on the west end of the A line, from Dejvická to Nemocnice Motol, was opened to the public on the afternoon of 6 April 2015. The second phase of this extension was expected to extend the line to Václav Havel Airport Prague. In 2015, it was announced that rail was the preferred option of connecting the city with the airport.

References

External links

Architecture photo series of all stations of A line (Prague Metro)

Prague Metro
Railway lines opened in 1978